The Sheriffs Act 1887 is an Act of the Parliament of the United Kingdom. It sets out the appointments and qualifications of sheriffs in England and Wales.

The Act gives sheriffs the right to arrest those resisting a warrant (posse comitatus).

References

United Kingdom Acts of Parliament 1887
English law